Joseph Morris was an American publisher of songsheet in Philadelphia during the early 20th century. The Library of Congress has several of his published works in its catalog and others in various collections of.musical documents.

Songsheet publications
"Preacher and the Bear"
"The Hall of Fame", music by John Dillon and words by Harry Dillon
"The Story of Two Floral Wreaths" by Tom Waters, "Sung with great success by Henry and Young."
"You're Going on a Long, Long Journey Soon", words by Arthur Longbrake and music by Arthur Hauk
"'Neath the Lines of Vermont" by Horace Strouse
"Singing Bird"; Indian Intermezzo by Ed Edwards
"I'd Like to Know Where I Met You", lyrics by Arthur Longbrake and music by A. Jackson Peabody Jr.
"Brother Noah Gave Out Checks for Rain", "The Great Baseball Song", music and lyrics by Arthur Longbrake. Cover features an image of Ed Morton and a bigoted depiction of African Americans with exaggerated features playing baseball
If I Only Had A Sweetheart (1908) by J. E. Dempsey
"Chop Sticks Waltz" by Arthur De Zulli (Euphemia Allen)
"Missouri Rag" by W. C. Powell (1907)

References

American music publishers (people)
People from Philadelphia